Goatman or Goat man may refer to:

 Goatman (urban legend), a legendary creature from Prince George's County, Maryland, United States
 Goatman (Kentucky), also known as the Pope Lick Monster, a legendary creature of Louisville, Kentucky, United States 
 Goatman (Texas), also known as the Lake Worth monster, a legendary creature from Lake Worth, Texas, United States
 GoatMan: How I Took a Holiday from Being Human, a 2016 book by Thomas Thwaites
 The Goat Man, Ches McCartney (died 1998), American traveler 
 Goatman or faun, mythical creature from Roman mythology
 Goatman or Faunus, Roman god and leader of the fauns